The 2007 Georgia helicopter incident refers to the accusation by Georgia that three Russian helicopters fired  on the Kodori Gorge in Abkhazia on March 11, 2007. It was a break-away autonomous republic in north-western Georgia (at that time, the Kodori Gorge was the only portion of Abkhazia still under Georgia's control.) The attack was at the village of Chkhalta, which damaged a school, and the government headquarters of the Georgian-backed Abkhaz government-in-exile. Russia denied any attacks and said all its aircraft near the area were grounded over the weekend.

Reactions

Georgia
Georgian President Mikheil Saakashvili held an emergency meeting after the alleged incident and told the Security Council that the incident created a grave situation and constituted "a very dangerous, serious and far-reaching provocation" but he stopped short of pointing the finger at Russia directly. He said that he didn't "want to make accusations against one particular side. The [Georgian] foreign minister has received instructions to contact his Russian counterpart and firmly demand that Russia react to this situation."

On March 14, Nikoloz Rurua, the then deputy chairman of the Georgian parliament's Committee for Defense and Security, did point the finger at Russia as he said that the helicopters came from Russian territory. He further said that the "helicopters, preliminarily identified as Mi-24 attack gunships, flew [into the Kodori Gorge] from Russian territory or, to be precise, from the territory of Kabardino-Balkaria. They made a circle above the villages of Upper Abkhazia, and as they were making a second circle they dropped about 20 unguided rockets, or so-called NURS (Russian-made unguided) rockets." Georgian Deputy Foreign Minister Eka Sguladze made similar allegations in remarks to foreign diplomats that day.

Russia
The deputy commander of Russia's ground forces, Lieutenant General Valery Yevnevich responded that helicopters could not have flown over the Caucasus mountain range. Yevnevich said:

"From the Russian side, it is impossible for helicopters to find a passage to fly through because of the high mountains. Mount Elbrus is over 5,000 meters high. Helicopters cannot fly over the Caucasus mountain range for technical reasons."

Russian Foreign Ministry spokesman Mikhail Kamynin added that Russia was investigating the circumstances of the shooting, but noted that the air force said it did not conduct flights in the area at the time.

Abkhazia
Abkhazia’s leader Sergei Bagapsh denied such incident.

United Nations
A quadripartite Joint Fact-Finding Group (JFFG) was convened to investigate the incident. The JFFG, headed by the UN Observer Mission in Georgia, also involved representatives of Russian peacekeepers, and both the Georgian and Abkhaz sides. The interim report was released on April 2, 2007, followed by a supplementary report on June 13. The report was inconclusive, but it confirmed that "helicopters used multiple approaches from the north" to reach the upper Kodori Gorge. It also ruled out the possibility of Georgia's involvement in the incident.

Aftermath
Georgia accused Russia of a similar incident in August 2007 when a missile was allegedly fired upon Georgian soil, which was denied by Russia. Georgia pressed the UN Security Council to look into both the helicopter and the missile incident.

On August 22, 2007, a plane downing incident took place that involved the downing by Georgia's anti-aircraft system, of a military plane that violated Georgia's air space. Abkhazia's break-away government stated that a plane was crashed by itself, and rejected that it was shot down.

References

Georgia helicopter incident
Helicopter incident
Abkhaz–Georgian conflict
Georgia (country)–Russia relations
Georgia Helicopter Attack, 2007
Helicopter incident
Georgia Helicopter Attack, 2007
March 2007 events in Asia
Helicopter attacks
2007 airstrikes